EuropaCorp S.A. (stylised in opening logo as EUROPA CORP.) is a French motion picture company headquartered in Saint-Denis, a northern suburb of Paris, and one of a few full service independent studios that both produces and distributes feature films. It specializes in production, distribution, home entertainment, VOD, sales, partnerships and licenses, recording, publishing and exhibition. EuropaCorp's integrated financial model generates revenues from a wide range of sources, with films from many genres and a strong presence in the international markets. 
 
Over 14 years, EuropaCorp has produced and co-produced over 80 films and is now distributing over 500 titles after the integration of the RoissyFilms Catalogue. The studio is mainly known for its expertise in the production of English-language films with strong earning potential in the international marketplace. The company developed and produced the successful Taken trilogy and the Transporter series. The company began producing TV series in 2010 through EuropaCorp Television which had already adapted EuropaCorp's popular Taxi film franchise.

Since 2018, the company has faced tumultuous times following rape and sexual assault accusations towards its chairman and majority owner Luc Besson.

History 
The company was created by Luc Besson in 1992 under the name Leeloo Productions, but it only fully began producing and co-producing feature films many years later, with the release of Taxi and The Dancer. The company was renamed EuropaCorp in 2000. Luc Besson had also created a smaller production company called Les Films du Dauphin in 1990 that has existed outside of Leeloo Productions / EuropaCorp. Pierre-Ange Le Pogam, old associate of Besson from Gaumont, the production company behind many earlier Besson's directed films, joined EuropaCorp in 2000. He had worked with Besson since 1985 first as a Distribution Director and from 1997 as a Deputy Chief Executive Officer at Gaumont. He became known as the right-hand man of Besson at EuropaCorp. He left the company in 2011 over disagreements with Besson.

In July 2007 EuropaCorp successfully managed its IPO on Euronext Paris. In May 2008, the CSA, French authority for media regulation, selected the EuropaCorp TV project in its invitation to apply for a mobile TV channel in France. In 2013 Lisa Ellzey, hitherto producer for Lionsgate and 20th Century Fox, was appointed as executive vice president of U.S. Motion Picture Production of EuropaCorp.

In 2018, Besson was accused of rape by an actress who wishes to remain anonymous. EuropaCorp stocks dropped 17% to just €2.31 ($2.70) after the rape allegation. Later the same year, EuropaCorp sold its French television division to Mediawan and renamed into Storia Television. EuropaCorp also agreed to sell the Roissy Films library to Gaumont. Five more women made similar statements against Besson.

In May 2019 EuropaCorp was granted a six-month debt waiver from a French commercial court and placed under court protection. A week later the studio filed for bankruptcy protection in the United States. Its stock value had fallen to €0.67. It had no films in production. In December 2019 the company was $182 million in debt and it had been in long bailout negotiations with Vine Alternative Investments.

Structure 
In 2007 EuropaCorp was owned at 62% by Luc Besson through his company Frontline and at 8.06% by Pierre-Ange Le Pogam; 23% was public.

Besson was appointed the chairman of EuropaCorp's board of directors. Jean-Julien Baronnet was the chief executive officer of EuropaCorp until November 2008. Christophe Lambert was CEO from 2010 to 2016. Marc Shmuger was appointed as CEO in 2016.

Digital Factory is related to EuropaCorp via Luc Besson. The handling of post-production sound is performed chiefly at its Normandy site, while the visual effects are done in Paris.

In September 2016 it was announced that Chinese film company Fundamental Films had acquired a stake of 27.9% in EuropaCorp, becoming the second-largest shareholder in the company.

In June 2017, EuropaCorp signed a music publishing deal with Sony/ATV Music Publishing. And later that month, the studio posted a loss of 120 million euros (US$135 million).

International dimension 
EuropaCorp has produced the world box-office hits Taken ($224 million at world box-office), Arthur and the Invisibles ($107 million), Transporter 3 ($106 million) and Hitman ($100 million).
Two EuropaCorp productions have been topping the US box-office: Transporter 2 by summer 2005 and Taken at spring 2009.

Many international film stars have appeared in EuropaCorp productions: Jim Carrey,  Penélope Cruz, Robert De Niro, David Duchovny, Morgan Freeman, Salma Hayek, Tommy Lee Jones, Jet Li, John Malkovich, Jason Statham, Brittany Murphy, Liam Neeson, Madonna, Freddie Highmore, Ewan McGregor, Lou Reed, and others. Consequently, the films are usually shot in English.

EuropaCorp Japan, a subsidiary of EuropaCorp based in Tokyo, has for core business the distribution of feature films in Japan. It is a joint-venture with three Japanese companies: Asmik Ace, Sumitomo Corporation and Kadokawa.

In 2012, EuropaCorp struck a three-year output deal with Chinese film distributor Fundamental Films for 15 feature films. Fundamental Films agreed to co-produce three of these films.

In May 2015, the company announced an output deal with Polish film distributor Kino Swiat.

"Cité du Cinéma", French movie studios 
EuropaCorp relocated to the Cité du Cinéma  in 2012. This movie studio complex, located in Saint-Denis in the close outskirts of Paris, at build out will have a total of nine film stages, with another 12,000 square metres of space devoted to technical units and 2200 square metres for screening and reception rooms.

The cinema school Louis-Lumière National High School is to be relocated to the complex.

EuropaCorp signed a lease with the Nef Lumière, owner of the tertiary complex, for space for its permanent staff and the film crews, with extra space for potential new activities. This tertiary complex is financed by both the Caisse des Dépôt and Vinci.

EuropaCorp is a minority shareholder in the company operating the studios, joining Euro Media Group, Quinta Communications and Frontline. The Euro Media Group, which owns several film studios throughout Europe, will provide management of daily operations of these studios of Paris.

Films

Television series 
 No Limit (2012–2015)
 Transporter: The Series (2012–2014)
 Nom de code: Rose (2012)
 XIII: The Series (2011–2012)
 Flight of the Storks (2012)
 Taxi Brooklyn (2014)
 Taken (2017–2018)

Awards and nominations 
 2009: In the Beginning directed by Xavier Giannoli competed as France's Official Selection in the Cannes Film Festival.
 2009: I Love You Phillip Morris, in which Glenn Ficarra and John Requa directed the film stars Jim Carrey and Ewan McGregor, competed for the Camera d’Or during the Director’s Fortnight.
 2009: Taken, directed by Pierre Morel, was nominated at the Teen Choice Award for the Action Adventure Movie Award. The movie and its soundtrack composer Nathaniel Mechaly in particular, won the BMI Film Music Award.
 2009: Human Zoo, directed by Rie Rasmussen, competed at the 59th Berlin Film Festival in the Panorama section, as well as at the film festivals in Copenhagen and Rio de Janeiro.
 2007: Hitman, directed by Xavier Gens, won the Golden Trailer Award 2008 for Best Motion/Title Graphics.
 2007: Arthur and the Invisibles, directed by Luc Besson, won the NRJ Ciné Award 2007 for Best Dubbing; the film was also nominated at the Young Artist Award for Best International Family Feature Film and Best Performance in an International Feature Film - Leading Young Actor with Freddie Highmore.
 2006: The Chinese Botanist's Daughters, directed by Dai Sijie, won in 2006 the Best Artistic Contribution and People’s Choice Awards at the Montreal World Film Festival, and was nominated for the «Grand Prix des Amériques». The film won the Best Canadian Film or Video Award at the 2007 Toronto Inside Out Lesbian and Gay Film and Video Festival.
 2005: The Three Burials of Melquiades Estrada, by Tommy Lee Jones, was nominated for the Palme d'Or, and Tommy Lee Jones won the Best Actor Award while Guillermo Arriaga won the Best Script Award. The movie was given a place of honor at the Satellite Awards 2005 and the Independent Spirit Awards 2005. It also won the "Grand Prix" at the Flanders International Film Festival and the Bronze Wrangler at the Western Heritage Awards.

References

External links 
  Europacorp at Uni France
  EuropaCorp Official Website
  Europacorp at Cineuropa
  Euronext Website
  Digital Factory website
  Roissy Film website
  Dog Productions website 
  Editions Intervista website
  Edition Septième Choc website
  EuropaCorp Japan website

EuropaCorp films
French film studios
2007 initial public offerings
Companies listed on Euronext Paris
Mass media companies established in 1992
Film production companies of France
Film distributors of France
French companies established in 1992
Luc Besson
Mass media in Paris
Newsreels
International sales agents